No.70 or LXX Squadron RAF provides strategic transport.

History

First World War
The squadron was formed on 22 April 1916 at Farnborough, and was equipped with the Sopwith 1½ Strutter. The squadron was posted to France, and in 1917 re-equipped with Sopwith Camels.

During World War I, the squadron claimed 287 victories, and had as members nineteen aces, including Frank Granger Quigley, John Todd, Frank Hobson, Oscar Heron, Frank Gorringe, Walter M. Carlaw, George Robert Howsam, Clive Franklyn Collett, Alfred Michael Koch, Kenneth Bowman Watson, Noel Webb, Edward Gribben, and Frederic Laurence.

Inter-war years
The squadron briefly disbanded in January 1920, reforming nine days later at Heliopolis, Egypt, via the renumbering of No. 58 Squadron. The squadron was now a bomber-transport unit operating the Vickers Vimy bomber.  After transferring  to  Hinaidi, Iraq in December 1921, the squadron was re-equipped with Vickers Vernons and subsequently by Vickers Victoria in  1926. In   addition to  providing heavy transport facilities to both air and ground units  they were used as air ambulances and were responsible for maintaining the Cairo-Baghdad airmail route. The squadron was commanded by Group Captain Eric Murray DSO MC. In 1929, he flew the first route to the Cape on behalf of Imperial Airways who were seeking routes for the civil flights.

In December 1928, a coup against the Amir of Afghanistan by  Habibullah Kalakani supported  by Ghilzai peoples led to the first large scale air evacuation, the Kabul Airlift. Over two months Victoria troop-carriers  of 70 squadron played central role in the airlift of 586 British and European officials and civilians  flying over mountains at a height of up to  often in  severe weather.

The Valentia replaced the Victorias in November 1934. 70 squadron is recorded as being based at RAF Habbaniya from 1937–9 and in August 1939, it returned to Egypt.

Second World War
After Italy entered the war the squadron converted to Vickers Wellingtons, and began operations over the Western Desert.

In 1940 A detachment was sent to Tatoi, in support of Allied forces defending Greece and in 1941 the squadron was involved in the campaign to conquer Vichy-occupied Syria  and the Rashid Ali rebellion in Iraq.

70 Squadron relocated frequently in support of the 8th Army's westward advance, first into Libya then Tunisia. In  November 1943 it relocated to Djedeida 20 miles west of Tunis putting industrial targets in the North of Italy, within easy reach. Between December 1943 and October 1945 the squadron relocated to Tortorella Airfield, Italy where  the Wellington's were replaced by the long range Liberators.

Post World War II

The squadron disbanded in April 1947 and was reformed in May 1948, at RAF Kabrit, Egypt when No. 215 Squadron was renumbered No. 70 Squadron. The squadron was equipped with Douglas Dakotas until 1950, when it re-equipped with Vickers Valettas. In 1955, the squadron moved to RAF Nicosia, Cyprus and re-equipped with the Handley Page Hastingss, Vickers Valetta and later used the Percival Pembroke twin engined communication aircraft. In 1966 the squadron moved to RAF Akrotiri. While there they won the Lord Trophy at RAF El Adem in competition with five other medium range transport squadrons. After a brief period operating Armstrong Whitworth Argosy C.1s, the squadron began conversion to the Lockheed C-130 Hercules in 1970, and moved to RAF Lyneham in 1975, after 55 years overseas. After 35 years of operating the Hercules C1/C3 from Lyneham, the squadron disbanded in September 2010.

The squadron reformed on 1 October 2014 and was officially "stood up" on 24 July 2015 by presentation with a new standard by Princess Anne becoming the Royal Air Force's first frontline A400M squadron.

In 2017 the squadron was part of Op Ruman, the humanitarian aid relief after Hurricane Irma.

In August 2021, the squadron was deployed forward Al Minhad airbase in Dubai, United Arab Emirates, sending two aircraft to assist with Operation Pitting. This was the largest Royal Air Force airlift since the Berlin Airlift, helping to evacuate British Nationals and vulnerable Afghanis from Kabul Airport.

Aircraft operated

See also
List of RAF squadrons

References
Notes

Bibliography

 

.

External links

070 Squadron
070 Squadron
Military units and formations established in 1916
1916 establishments in the United Kingdom
Military units and formations in Mandatory Palestine in World War II